Kirkham and Wesham railway station serves the Lancashire towns of Kirkham and Wesham, in England. It is managed by Northern Trains, who operate most of the passenger services that call there.

Description
There were originally two platforms, but work in 2017 and 2018, added a third. There are fairly obvious signs of the former size of the station in the form of disused sidings areas and blocked-off arches. The station ticket office is at street level with two staircases leading down to the platforms. Originally a cast iron and glass roof covered the platforms similar to that at Poulton-le-Fylde station. This was removed in the 1960s. In 2018 lifts were also installed.

Fast lines used to run from Kirkham North Junction (located a half a mile to the west of the station) to what was known as Kirkham South Junction - just east of the station allowing through trains to pass without running through the platforms. These were the last vestige of the four track which originally started at Preston and were removed during remodelling work in 2017 to allow for a third platform and a faster alignment of the remaining and new lines
As part of the works, all of the disused sidings were removed.
The signalbox at Kirkham North Junction was opened in 1903 and had over 70 levers and was worked by two signalmen and a train recorder. A framed summary in the box detailed the total number of train movements there in a 24-hour period in July 1936 as 656 - the vast majority of these would have been connected with the Blackpool holiday trade.

History
The station, opened in 1840, was originally located to the west of Station Road and named Kirkham.
In 1890, it was rebuilt on the east side of the road and later renamed Kirkham and Wesham. Historically the "Wrangway Brook", beside which the railway was laid, has always been the boundary between Kirkham and Wesham, and the station buildings are all situated in Kirkham.

Two tracks were built on the northern side of the line for a platform planned but never built due to the outbreak of World War II.

Kirkham Station signalbox which was located in between the Up (Salwick bound) Fast and the Down Fast line was demolished during resignalling operations in 1977. The same scheme also abolished Treales signalbox.

To the west of the station, Kirkham North Junction is where the suburban branch line to Blackpool South follows the Fylde coast through Lytham, Ansdell and Fairhaven, St Annes on Sea; the main line to  proceeds via Poulton. This junction involved a flyover to allow Preston-bound trains to access the Up Fast line from the Marton line. Although the Marton line closed in 1965, the disused flyover bridge was not removed until the 1980s.

In March 2011 the station was given a makeover with a major modernisation and refurbishment of the staircase. In 2017-2018 it was given another major refurbishment as part of the electrification programme.

Facilities
The station has a street-level ticket office, which is staffed throughout the week (06:40-17:45 Monday to Saturdays, 08:30-16:15 Sundays).  A self-service ticket machine has also been installed for use when the booking office is closed or to collect pre-paid tickets. Waiting shelters are in place at platform level, along with digital CIS displays and timetable posters.  There was no step-free access to the platforms, but new lifts were installed as part of the Preston to Blackpool electrification scheme.

Electrification and rebuild
As part of GNRP - Great North Rail Project and NPR - Northern Powerhouse Rail, the line from Manchester to Blackpool North was approved by the government for electrification. It was originally approved in 2009 The opportunity was taken to completely renew the signaling of the line and rebuild and improve stations along the line including Kirkham and Wesham. A big chunk of the work was done in a blockade. The plans have seen the track layout remodelled (with the non-platform lines removed), a third platform added, the footbridge rebuilt, new signalling installed and the route from Preston - Blackpool North electrified.  The route to Blackpool South has not been electrified. The work at the station started in mid 2017 with a total blockade from Preston to Blackpool North and South starting in November 2017 and completed in April 2018, in time for the May 2018 timetable change. The station reopened with service to Blackpool South on 29 January 2018, but reopening of the line to Blackpool North was pushed back to 16 April 2018, as a result of bad weather and maintenance issues with one of the infrastructure trains being used in the upgrade works.

Services
As of December 2022, the following Northern services call at the station:
 1tph to  via the Calder Valley line (Monday - Saturday only)
 1tph to 

Additionally, on Sundays only, 1 train every 2 hours on the  route extends to  via the East Lancashire line. 

Gallery

References

External links

Railway stations in the Borough of Fylde
DfT Category E stations
Former Preston and Wyre Joint Railway stations
Railway stations in Great Britain opened in 1840
Railway stations served by Avanti West Coast
Northern franchise railway stations